God and Other Minds is a 1967 book by the American philosopher of religion Alvin Plantinga which re-kindled philosophical debate on the existence of God in Anglo-American philosophical circles by arguing that belief in God was like belief in other minds: although neither could be demonstrated conclusively against a determined sceptic both were fundamentally rational. Though Plantinga later modified some of his views, particularly on the soundness of the ontological argument and on the nature of epistemic rationality, he still stands by the basic theses of the book.

Summary of God and Other Minds
God and Other Minds: A Study of the Rational Justification of Belief in God was originally published by Cornell University Press in 1967.  An edition with a new preface by Plantinga was published in 1990.

The book explores the rationality of belief in God, as conceived in the Hebrew-Christian tradition. In Part, I, Plantinga examines a number of traditional arguments for God's existence and concludes that none successfully demonstrate God's existence. In Part II, he considers and rejects some major arguments against belief in God, including the problem of evil, the paradox of omnipotence, and verificationism. Finally, in Part III, he explores various analogies between belief in God and belief in other minds. He concludes that these two beliefs are in the same epistemic boat: if one is rationally justified, so is the other. Since belief in other minds is clearly rational, Plantinga argues, so is belief in God.

The book has the following chapters:

Part I: Natural Theology
 Ch 1: The Cosmological Argument
 Ch 2: The Ontological Argument - I
 Ch 3: The Ontological Argument - II
 Ch 4: The Teleological Argument

Part II: Natural Atheology
 Ch 5: The Problem of Evil
 Ch 6: The Free Will Defense
 Ch 7: Verificationism and other Atheologica

Part III: God and Other Minds

 Ch 8: Other Minds and Analogy
 Ch 9: Alternatives to the Analogical Position
 Ch 10: God and Analogy

Scholarly reaction

Michael A. Slote in The Journal of Philosophy considered that "[t]his book is one of the most important to have appeared in this century on the philosophy of religion, and makes outstanding contributions to our understanding of the problem of other minds as well".

According to the philosopher William Lane Craig, God and Other Minds helped to revitalize philosophy of religion after the palmy days of logical positivism by applying "the tools of analytic philosophy to questions in the philosophy of religion with an unprecedented rigor and creativity."

Plantinga's response to the problem of evilthe so-called free will defense, which argues that it is possible that God could not have created a world with a better balance of good over evil than does the actual worldprovoked considerable scholarly discussion.

References

External links
 SEP article on Other Minds

Philosophy books
1967 non-fiction books
Books with atheism-related themes
Cornell University Press books